Woodstock 1999 is a two-CD live album recorded at the Woodstock '99 festival. It was released via Epic Records in October 1999, about three months after the event took place.

The set features one song from each of 32 performing artists. It also features the recording of the speech given when the fires got out of hand and the Red Hot Chili Peppers' performance was paused on the last day of the festival, on the track "Interlude" (disc one, track 16).

Each disc was also released separately with the titles Woodstock 1999 Vol. 1 – Red Album and Woodstock 1999 Vol. 2 – Blue Album.

The album was certified Gold by the Music Canada and the Recording Industry Association of America in 1999. The DVD version was certified Platinum in 2002.

Track listing
Disc one

Disc two

Certifications

References

1999 live albums
Epic Records live albums
Live rock albums
Woodstock Festival